The North American Indoor Football League (NAIFL) was a proposed indoor football league that announced plans in 2004 to begin play in fourteen Canadian cities beginning in February 2005. The game played was to be a unique indoor version of Canadian football. Teams were to be centrally owned, and former Edmonton Eskimos quarterback Tom Wilkinson was to serve as league president. The league never played a single game and its website went offline in early 2006.

The 14 teams announced were:

East Division

West Division

References

External links
NAIFL.ca archived on August 30, 2005
Discussion thread at OurSportsCentral.com

Defunct Canadian football leagues
Defunct indoor American football leagues
2005 in Canadian football